Yoni Zigelboum (born November 4, 1991), also known as Yoni Z, is an American recording artist, songwriter, and entertainer from Brooklyn, New York. He has worked as a musician since the age of 15. Since 2012 Zigelboum has toured worldwide as a musical performer.  He has earned the reputation as “the walking jukebox,” and his YouTube channel has over 9 million views.

Early life

Born, raised, and currently residing in Crown Heights, Brooklyn, New York, Zigelboum spent his childhood playing in his Orthodox Jewish neighborhood. 

His initial plans were to go to college and work in the field of psychology. His parents, originally disheartened with his decision to pursue music instead of medicine, supported his decision after seeing how important music was to him and the positive reception of his performances.

Musical influences

Parental influence was strong in Zigelboum's life. His father is of as Ashkenazi Jewish ancestry, descending from Jews exiled in Eastern Europe. Yoni's mother's family is Mizrahi Jewish, descending from Jews who remained in the Middle East. His father and his maternal grandfather were both cantors. Zigelboum also has family members who survived the Holocaust. His songs blend eastern and western Jewish cultures together.

Career

In October 2018, Zigelboum was chosen as Israel's Kikar HaShabbat's Best New Artist of the Year and Music Video of the Year for the Israeli video UP. He has performed at major sporting events, including singing the national anthem at a Miami Heat game in 2014, a Brooklyn Jewish Heritage Night performance hosted by the Brooklyn Nets in December 2015, and a Miami Heat Jewish Heritage Night half-time concert in December 2016. In August 2018, Yoni released the music video “AYO/Kadima,” setting a record for the number of music videos released from one Jewish album. He also performed at the first-ever Jamaican Passover program in Montego Bay in 2018.

Music videos

Zigelboum released music videos before his debut album. The video for Ma Naaseh was shot in the snow in the Carpathian Mountains of Romania. The Eilat Mountains of Israel were chosen as the location for the video of AYO/Kadima. The animated video for UP, created by a team of fifteen people, uses a child-friendly approach to convey its message.

Album
On July 26, 2018, Zigelboum released his debut album, consisting of 14 original songs. He participated in the songwriting and production of all album tracks. The album has been called "revolutionary" for Jewish music. The well received album  sold out during the pre-order, and immediately went into a second production. He released music videos for four of the album tracks.

Path
Zigelboum plans to continue producing his original music, released in several languages including Yiddish, English, and Hebrew.  He intends for Jewish music to have a worldwide audience with a similar popularity as other religious music.  He hopes that people of all faiths will turn to Jewish music for entertainment and guidance as he envisions a worldwide acceptance of his work.

Discography
Yoni Z (2018)
Ahava (2022)

References

External links
 Yoni Z Facebook Page
 Track List for album, Yoni Z

1991 births
Living people
Jewish American musicians
Hasidic singers
Jewish songwriters
Orthodox pop musicians